Mumbai Indians were one of the eight teams that took part in the 2010 Indian Premier League. They were captained by Sachin Tendulkar. They finished as runners-up of the tournament after losing to Chennai Super Kings by 22 runs in the finals. With this, they qualified for the 2010 Champions League Twenty20, where they could not progress past the group stages.

Background
Mumbai Indians had a dismal run in the 2009 edition of the IPL held in South Africa. They were placed at seven in the eight-team points table with just five wins from 14 matches. After the 2009 season, they trimmed their squad by releasing three overseas players in Luke Ronchi, Kyle Mills and Mohammad Ashraful along with several domestic players with an aim of building a new-look team for the 2010 season.

Pre-season player signings
At the players auction on 19 January 2010, Mumbai Indians bought just one player - hard-hitting Trinidadian all-rounder Kieron Pollard - for a sum of $750,000. Pollard, who had a base price of $200,000, had to go into a secret tie-breaker as four franchises bid the maximum amount of $750,000 for him. Although the actual amount of the bid by the Mumbai Indians was undisclosed, reports claim that the franchise bid as much as $2.75 million in the tie-breaker. However, according to IPL regulations, Pollard would be paid only the actual bidding amount with the rest of the money going into the IPL kitty.

Apart from Pollard, the Mumbai franchise bought a number of Indian domestic players including former ICL players who were made eligible to take part in the tournament. Former ICL players signed up by the franchise were Ambati Rayudu, Ali Murtaza, Abu Nechim, Stuart Binny, Rajagopal Sathish, Ishan Malhotra and Syed Sahabuddin. Other domestic signings include Aditya Tare, Rahul Shukla and Chandan Madan.

Squad
Players with international caps before the start of the 2010 IPL season are listed in bold.

Indian Premier League

Season standings

Match log

Most runs

Most wickets

Champions League Twenty20

Group standings

Most runs

Most wickets

See also
Chennai Super Kings in 2010

References

Mumbai Indians seasons
2010 Indian Premier League